Tender is a compilation album by British rock artists Wishbone Ash, released in May 2008 by the Talking Elephant label. It features mellow songs by the band and complements the album Tough, featuring a compilation of rock numbers, that was released at the same time.

Track listing
 "Top of the World"
 "The Ring"
 "Faith Hope and Love"
 "Loose Change"
 "Dreams Outta Dust"
 "Disappearing"
 "The Raven"
 "Everybody Needs a Friend"

References

2008 compilation albums
Wishbone Ash compilation albums